This is a list of individual dresses which are famous or otherwise notable.

Dresses worn by celebrities
 American Express Gold card dress of Lizzy Gardiner
 Black Christian Siriano gown of Billy Porter
 Black dress of Rita Hayworth
 Black Givenchy dress of Audrey Hepburn
 Black Versace dress of Angelina Jolie
 Black Versace dress of Elizabeth Hurley
 Black and white Valentino dress of Julia Roberts
 Blue Gucci dress of Harry Styles
 Blue Prada dress of Lupita Nyong'o
 Chartreuse Dior dress of Nicole Kidman
 Crimson Alberta Ferretti dress of Uma Thurman
 Elie Saab net dress of Halle Berry
 Green dress of Keira Knightley
 Green Versace dress of Jennifer Lopez
 Happy Birthday, Mr. President dress
 Ivory Jean Paul Gaultier dress of Marion Cotillard
 Lavender Prada dress of Uma Thurman
 Meat dress of Lady Gaga
 Navy blue Guy Laroche dress of Hilary Swank
 Pink dress of Marilyn Monroe
 Pink feathered Versace dress of Penélope Cruz
 Pink Ralph Lauren dress of Gwyneth Paltrow
 Plum Vera Wang dress of Keira Knightley
 Red dress of Julia Roberts
 Red Ben de Lisi dress of Kate Winslet
 Red Tarvydas dress of Rebecca Twigley
 Red Versace dress of Cindy Crawford
 Saffron Vera Wang dress of Michelle Williams
 Swan dress
 Swarovski crystal mesh Armani Privé gown
 Union Jack dress
 White dress of Marilyn Monroe
 White floral Givenchy dress of Audrey Hepburn
 White Marc Bouwer dress of Angelina Jolie
 White shift dress of Jean Shrimpton
 Yellow Valentino dress of Cate Blanchett

Coronation, wedding, and engagement dresses

 Coronation gown of Elizabeth II
 Coronation robes of Queen Victoria
 Engagement announcement dress of Catherine Middleton
 Wedding dress of Princess Alexandra of Denmark
 Wedding dress of Princess Alice of the United Kingdom
 Wedding dresses of Princess Anne
 Wedding dress of Princess Beatrice of the United Kingdom
 Wedding dress of Princess Beatrice of York
 Wedding dress of Carolyn Bessette
 Wedding dress of Birgitte van Deurs
 Wedding dress of Jacqueline Bouvier
 Wedding dress of Princess Elizabeth
 Wedding dress of Princess Eugenie of York
 Wedding dress of Sarah Ferguson
 Wedding dress of Princess Helena
 Wedding dress of Princess Helena of Waldeck and Pyrmont
 Wedding dress of Grace Kelly
 Wedding dress of Princess Louise of the United Kingdom
 Wedding dress of Princess Louise of Wales
 Wedding dress of Princess Louise Margaret of Prussia
 Wedding dress of Princess Margaret
 Wedding dress of Meghan Markle
 Wedding dress of Princess Marina of Greece and Denmark
 Wedding dress of Princess Mary of the United Kingdom
 Wedding dress of Princess Mary of Teck
 Wedding dress of Princess Maud of Wales
 Wedding dress of Catherine Middleton
 Wedding dress of Lady Alice Montagu Douglas Scott 
 Wedding dress of Camilla Parker Bowles
 Wedding dress of Sophie Rhys-Jones
 Wedding dress of Lady Diana Spencer
 Wedding dress of Queen Victoria
 Wedding dress of Victoria, Princess Royal
 Wedding dress of Wallis Warfield
 Wedding dress of Katharine Worsley

Historical dresses
 Bacton Altar Cloth, the only surviving dress of Queen Elizabeth I; so-named because it had been used as an altar cloth for centuries
 Cyclone, a 1939 evening dress by grand couturier Jeanne Lanvin
 Electric Light dress, a masquerade gown designed for Alice Vanderbilt in 1883 featuring a battery-powered electric bulb
 Kimberley Hall Mantua, the earliest complete European women's costume at the Metropolitan Museum of Art
 Lady Curzon's peacock dress, worn by Baroness Mary Curzon to celebrate the 1902 Coronation of King Edward VII and Queen Alexandra
 Pink Chanel suit of Jacqueline Bouvier Kennedy, worn during the 1963 assassination of her husband
 Tarkhan dress, a 5000-year old linen dress considered the known oldest woven garment

Other notable dresses
Alice in Wonderland dress, as illustrated by John Tenniel in Lewis Carroll's 1865 novel
Amsterdam Rainbow Dress, dress made of more than 70 flags of nations where homosexuality is illegal
Belle's ball gown, golden dress originally worn by the heroine of Disney's animated film Beauty and the Beast (1991)
 Berry Dress, a 1994 mixed-media sculpture by Alice Maher
 Climate Dress, embedded with LEDs that change color in reaction to carbon dioxide in the air
 Cream Dior dress of Princess Margaret
 The dress, a photograph of a dress that became a viral phenomenon due to dispute over the color of the garment
 Lobster dress, a dress designed by Elsa Schiaparelli and Salvador Dalí featuring a lobster
 Mayon gown, a red, high-slit dress worn by Catriona Gray during the evening gown competition in Miss Universe 2018
 Red Dress, an international 2009-2022 collaborative embroidery project coordinated by Kirstie Macleod
 Revenge dress, a black dress worn by Diana, Princess of Wales following the revelation that her husband had been unfaithful
 Travolta dress, black gown worn by Diana and named for John Travolta, with whom she danced while wearing it
 TechHaus Volantis, American electric-powered hover vehicle promoted by Lady Gaga as a "flying dress"
 Vanitas: Flesh Dress for an Albino Anorectic, created in 1987 by Jana Sterbak from 50 pounds of flank steak sewn together

See also
 List of hats
 Alice blue, a color name that originally referred to a dress worn by Alice Roosevelt Longworth, daughter of US President Theodore Roosevelt
"Alice Blue Gown", 1919 song about the dress

References

Further reading

Clothing-related lists